Thomas Goulard (1697–1784)  was a French surgeon famous for Goulard's extract, a solution of lead(II) acetate and lead(II) oxide which was formerly used as an astringent. Goulard was a surgeon and anatomist  in Montpellier who specialized in genitourinary disorders. His best known written work is titled Oeuvres de Chirurgie.

References

1697 births
1784 deaths
French surgeons

18th-century surgeons